Idol 2013 was the seventh series of Idol held in Norway, broadcast during the spring of 2013. Auditions were held in winter 2012/13, and broadcast in January 2013, with the semi-finals broadcast in January/February. The first final round was held on Friday February 15 at 20:00 CET, with the grand final being held on May 10, 2013 in Oslo Spektrum. 

It was won by Siri Vølstad Jensen, 17, from Ålgård in Rogaland, with 55% of the votes against runner-up Eirik Søfteland, 24, from Os outside Bergen.

Known only as Idol during broadcast, it was the first series to drop the subtitle Jakten på en superstjerne (literal:the hunt for a superstar).

Finals

Finalists
(ages during the finals)

Elimination chart

Notes

References

Season 07
2013 Norwegian television seasons